Constituent Assembly elections were held in Costa Rica on 8 December 1948, following the Costa Rican Civil War. The result was a victory for the National Unity Party, which won 34 of the 45 seats. Voter turnout was 47.5%. The assembly drew up the 1949 constitution.

Results

References

1948 elections in Central America
1948 in Costa Rica
Elections in Costa Rica